Ananth Dodabalapur  is an Indian-American engineer, currently the Motorola Regents Chair Professor in Electrical and Computer Engineering, and previously the Ashley H. Priddy Centennial Professor, at University of Texas at Austin and a published author. He was formerly with Bell Labs, Murray Hill, NJ for more than 10 years.

Research
His research has been in the areas of organic and inorganic semiconductor devices. His recent research is on nanoscale devices for 3D integrated circuits and new device architectures for displays, neuromorphic computing, printed electronics, and light emission.    He has made pioneering contributions to the fields of Organic LEDs, transistors, and Photonic Crystal Lasers. He has also worked on chemical sensors and Nano-Optics. He was the founding Editor-in-Chief of Flexible and Printed Electronics. His research work has been cited more than 30,000 times. His H-index is approximately 95.  He holds 27 US patents and these have been cited more than 2000 times. He has co-founded two companies - OrganiciD and Sensorbit Systems. OrganicID was acquired by Weyerhaeuser in 2006.

Awards and recognition
He is a Fellow of the National Academy of Inventors and Institute of Electrical and Electronics Engineers and was a Distinguished Lecturer of the IEEE. He was listed in Who's Who in America and Who's who in Science and Engineering. He is a recipient of the 2002 National Award for Team Innovation from the American Chemical Society.  His work on Organic Transistors has been listed in a compilation of key achievements in Electronics for the 20th century National Academy of Engineering#Greatest Engineering Achievements of the 20th Century in the category of Electronics.  He has also made pioneering contributions to the fields of Organic LEDs and Photonic Crystal Lasers. In March 2007, he was conferred honorary citizenship of the City of Harrisburg, Pennsylvania. He has received an "Old Cottonian of Eminence" Award from his Alma Mater, Bishop Cotton Boys' School, Bangalore in 2022.

Personal
He was born in Bangalore, India in 1963.  He attended Bishop Cotton Boys' School in Bangalore, Indian Institute of Technology Madras (where he received his bachelor's degree in Electrical Engineering), and University of Texas at Austin, where he obtained his Ph.D. degree in Electrical Engineering in 1990.  He is married to Rati Chitnis Dodabalapur and has two children, Sonia and Siddharth. He currently lives in the city of West Lake Hills, Texas.  He is a descendant of Dewan Purniah, the First Dewan of Mysore and of Dewan Sir P. N. Krishnamurti. He is a member of The Texas Rowing Center in Austin.

References

Year of birth missing (living people)
Living people
University of Texas at Austin faculty
21st-century American engineers
Bishop Cotton Boys' School alumni